Megaphone is an American rock band from Orlando, Florida. They formed in late 2004 when founding member Matt Bloodwell (former drummer of the well known Orlando band Precious) traded his drums for a guitar and recruited local rock musicians from the Orlando music scene. Megaphone is: Paul Smith - Lead guitar, former touring guitarist for Seven Mary Three - Mammoth/Atlantic, and Vonray - Elektra Records. James Woodrich - Bass guitar, formerly of My Hotel Year - Doghouse Records. Scott Smith - Drummer, formerly of Cori Yarckin and newest member of the band joining in March 2007.

Overview
Megaphone's founding member Matt Bloodwell was originally a drummer for punk rock band named Precious While in Precious, Matt Bloodwell was also writing songs. In October 2003, Matt left Precious to put together a band around the music he had been writing.  "Being someone who everyone knows as a drummer but no one really knows as a song writer, I felt like if I wanted people to take me seriously as a song writer I had to do something really different. OK, so I'll sing and play guitar in Megaphone." He then recruited local musicians. "I knew exactly what I wanted and I had a pretty good idea of who could pull it off. Now it was just a matter of are they going to like the material?" Guitarist Paul Smith, who has worked with Seven Mary Three, was just coming off the road with Vonray in support of their first Electra release when drummer Matt Brown introduced him to Bloodwells' demos.  Matt Brown had been the drummer for 3AE signed to RCA before tragedy ended the band to soon. Matt Brown joined Megaphone and was with the band until March 2007 when he was replaced by former Cori Yarckin drummer Scott Smith. James Woodrich from My Hotel Year joined the band as the bass player. "Everyone in this band has had such a great history individually, our hope is that our future together will be even better." In early discussions, friends (such as Ryan of My Hotel Year) suggested using Bloodwell in the band name, but Matt thought it sounded heavier than the sound he was going for. On August 12, 2004 Megaphone played their first show at Wills Pub with New Roman Times and Spacebar.

In addition to being the lead singer, songwriter, and rhythm guitarist for Megaphone, Matt Bloodwell's primary instrument is drums, which he began playing at the age of seven. He is currently a part-time percussionist for Blue Man Group at Universal Studios in Orlando, Florida and he was the drummer for the rock cover band Mulch, Sweat, n' Shears formerly at Disney's Hollywood Studios. Bloodwell has also arranged, performed and produced song Halloween-loween for Walt Disney World Magic Kingdom's Villains Mix and Mingle show at Mickey's Not-So-Scary Halloween Party 2006-2010 and his voice was heard singing lead vocals on Disney Tokyo's Haunted Rock'n Streets Halloween parade 2007.

Megaphone has opened for such national acts as AC/DC, Paul Stanley, Ace Frehley, The Joe Perry Project, Crash Kings, Seven Mary Three, Everclear, Edwin McCain and The New Left. They've also made appearances at WJRR 101.1's Earthday Birthday 12 & 14, and the 2005, 2007-2009 Florida Music Festival Main Stage.

Band members

Current members
 Matt Bloodwell – vocals, guitar
 Paul Smith - guitar, background vocals
 Eric van Lugo – bass, background vocals
 Scott Smith  – drums

Former members
 Matt Brown – drums (2004–2007)
 James Woodrich – bass, background vocals (2004–2011)

Discography 
For Cryin' Out Loud (April 15, 2005)
The Perfect Gift Christmas song - single (November 24, 2007)
Exit Silent Mode (August 1, 2009)

Awards
 Best Pop Band and 2nd Best Mainstream Rock Band in the Orlando 2010 by The Orlando Weekly Magazine
 Best Rock/Pop act in Orlando 2008 by The Orlando Weekly Magazine 
 Best Rock/Pop act & 2nd Best Live Act in Orlando 2007 by The Orlando Weekly magazine 
 Net Music Countdown's Top Net, January 5, 2007

References

External links 
 

Musical groups from Orlando, Florida
Alternative rock groups from Florida
Musical quintets
Musical groups established in 2004
American pop rock music groups